RMB may refer to:

Culture 
 RMB (band)
 Ryan Montbleau Band, Boston-based musicians

Educational institution
Rajdharpur Madhyamik Bidyalay, a secondary school in Bangladesh

Economics 
 Malaysian ringgit, also sometimes referred to as RMB
 Money supply, sometimes referred to as real money balances, the supply of money available to the public
 Internationalization of the renminbi
 Rand Merchant Bank, part of the First National Bank
 Renminbi, the currency of the People's Republic of China

Sports 
 Real Madrid Baloncesto, a Spanish professional basketball team
 Rødovre Mighty Bulls, a Danish professional ice hockey team

Technology 
 Right Mouse Button on a Mouse (computing)
 Rocky Mountain BASIC

Other uses 
 Restaurant Miniature Buffet, a type of British Railways Mark 1 coach
 RMB-93 (ruzhyo magazinnoye boyevoye model 1993), a Russian combat shotgun 
 Rocky Mountain Bicycles, a Canadian bicycle manufacturer
 Rural Mail Box, used by Australia Post
 Rumbia LRT station (LRT station abbreviation), a Light Rail Transit station in Sengkang, Singapore